
Ed Hawkins may refer to:

Persons
 Ed Hawkins, a writer of the 1975 film Sasquatch, the Legend of Bigfoot
 Ed Hawkins (climatologist), British climatologist and designer of certain data visualization graphics
 Eddie Hawkins, former American soccer player
 Edwin Hawkins (1943-2018), American gospel musician

Fictional characters
 Ed Hawkins, a character in the television series Awake
 Ed Hawkins, a character in the 1998 film Goldrush: A Real Life Alaskan Adventure
 Ed Hawkins, a character in the 1988 film Out of Time

Other
 Ed Hawkins, a horse that is an ancestor of American saddlebred stallion Rex McDonald

See also
 Edward Hawkins (disambiguation)